Thomas Amugi Tetteh (born 6 August 1980) is a Ghanaian former footballer who is last known to have played as a midfielder for Zadar.

Career

In 2001, Amugi signed for Croatian side Zadar, where he feigned injury whenever not being paid on time, before returning to Ghana despite still being a Zadar player.

References

External links
 

Ghanaian footballers
Ghanaian expatriate footballers
Expatriate footballers in Croatia
NK Zadar players
Croatian Football League players
Living people
Association football midfielders
1980 births
Ghanaian expatriate sportspeople in Croatia